Jean-Julien Rojer and Horia Tecău were the defending champions, but they chose to compete in Basel instead.

Eric Butorac and Scott Lipsky won the title, defeating Feliciano López and Max Mirnyi in the final 7–6(7–4), 6–3 .

Seeds

Draw

Draw

External links
 Main draw
 Qualifying draw

Valencia Open - Doubles